The 2016–17 Hellenic Football League season was the 64th in the history of the Hellenic Football League, a football competition in England.

Premier Division

Premier Division featured 16 clubs which competed in the division last season, along with three new clubs:
 Burnham, relegated from the Southern Football League
 Carterton, promoted from Division One West
 Henley Town, promoted from Division One East

League table

Promotion criteria	
To be promoted at the end of the season a team must:	
 Have applied to be considered for promotion by the end of November 	
 Pass a ground grading examination by the end of March	
 Finish the season in a position higher than that of any other team also achieving criteria 1 and 2	
 Finish the season in one of the top three positions

The following four teams have achieved criterion one:
 Bracknell Town
 Flackwell Heath
 Thame United
 Thatcham Town

Division One East

Division One East featured eleven clubs which competed in the division last season, along with three new clubs:
AFC Aldermaston, promoted from the Thames Valley Premier League 
Sandhurst Town, transferred from the Combined Counties League
Wokingham & Emmbrook, relegated from the Premier Division

League table

Division One West

Division One West featured 13 clubs which competed in the division last season, along with three new clubs:
 Abingdon United, relegated from the Premier Division
 Milton United, relegated from the Premier Division
 Woodstock Town, transferred from Division One East, with a change of name from Old Woodstock Town

League table

Division Two East

Division Two East featured 7 clubs which competed in the division last season, along with 7 new clubs:
 Aston Clinton development
 Chalfont Wasps reserves
 Chalvey Sports
 Henley Town reserves
 Lynch Pin
 Milton Keynes Academy
 Oxford City development

League table

Division Two West

Division Two West featured 9 clubs which competed in the division last season, along with 5 new clubs:
Abingdon United reserves
Bourton Rovers, joined from the Witney and District League 
Easington Sports reserves
Faringdon Town, joined from the North Berks Football League
Shrivenham reserves, rejoined the League

League table

References

External links
 Official Site

2016–17
9